Wabasso replicatus is spider species from Scotland to Russia.

See also 
 List of Linyphiidae species (Q–Z)

References

External links 

Linyphiidae
Spiders of Russia
Spiders of Europe
Spiders described in 1950